Anne Bower Ingram  (1937–2010) was an Australian children's author and publisher.

Life
Ingram was born in Manilla, New South Wales on 18 October 1937. She left school at 15 to work in a bookshop. At age 21 Ingram travelled to Britain, and joined the publisher William Collins.

Anne married Clark Ingram in 1964, but they divorced in 1977. Over her career, she launched and supported the careers of countless writers and illustrators and championed Australian children's literature in Australia and overseas.

For the 1988 bicentenary, Ingram organized for an exhibition of Australian children's book illustrations in Bologna and other European destinations.

Ingram died on 26 March 2010 aged 72.

Awards
1984 Lady Cutler Award for Distinguished Services to Children's Literature in New South Wales 
1985 Dromkeen Medal
1986 Medal of the Order of Australia

Works
Shudders and Shakes: Ghostly tales from Australia, Collins, 1972 
Too True: Australian tall tales, Collins, 1974 
The Pickled Boeing : An illustrated collection of stories and poems, as editor, Children's Medical Research Foundation, 1982 
Mouse's Marriage, co-author and illustrator Junko Morimoto, Lothian Books, 1985 
Ford Family Car Fun Book, co-compiler Peggy O'Donnell, illustrated by Bob Graham, Ellsyd Press, 1986 
 The Twin Stars, adapted from story by Kenji Miyazawa, illustrated by Junko Morimoto, Lothian Books, 1986 
Camping : Let's do it together, co-author Peggy O'Donnell, illustrated by Bob Graham, Ellsyd Press, 1987 
Making a Picture Book, Methuen Australia, 1987 
The Moose, the Goose and the Watermelon Juice, by Sue Jackman, illustrated by Clare Watson, Collins, 1989

References

External links 
 
Dromkeen Medal at Scholastic Australia

1937 births
2010 deaths
Australian children's writers
Writers from New South Wales
Recipients of the Medal of the Order of Australia